Judgment of Lake Balaton or Balaton Condemned (German title: Menschen im Sturm) is a 1933 Austrian-Hungarian drama film directed by Werner Hochbaum and starring Gyula Csortos, Maria Mindzenty and Antal Páger.

It is now a lost film. A separate Hungarian-language version The Verdict of Lake Balaton was also made, directed by Paul Fejos.

Plot summary

Cast
 Gyula Csortos as Kovács  
 Maria Mindzenty as Mari, Kovács lánya  
 Antal Páger as Jani, Kovács fogadott fia  
 Mór Ditrói as Szabó  
 Ernõ Elekes as Mihály, Szabó fia  
 Erzsi Palotai as Síró asszony  
 Elemér Baló as Toronyõr

References

Bibliography 
 Günther Dahlke & Günter Karl. Deutsche Spielfilme von den Anfängen bis 1933: ein Filmführer. Henschelverlag Kunst und Gesellschaft, 1988.

External links 
 

1933 films
Austrian drama films
1930s German-language films
1933 drama films
Hungarian drama films
Films directed by Werner Hochbaum
Hungarian multilingual films
Austrian multilingual films
Films about fishing
Austrian black-and-white films
Hungarian black-and-white films
Lost Hungarian films
1933 multilingual films
1933 lost films
Lost drama films